Heidelberg-Ziegelhausen is a residential district (of fourteen) at the eastern perimeter of the city of Heidelberg, Germany.

Ziegelhausen lies on the northern banks of the Neckar River and extends northward into the Odenwald Forest.  It has a small shopping district but is dominated by single-family and multiple-family houses.  

Ziegelhausen's abundant supply of water and steep, south-facing slopes made it a center of the Neckar Valley laundry trade in the 18th and 19th centuries. Johannes Brahms summered in Ziegelhausen during the 1880s.

Ziegelhausen has several small parks, including one that features a playground of Niki de Saint-Phalle-inspired tile sculptures.

The symbol of Ziegelhausen is a house with red clay roof shingles.  It is on local teams' shirt for most 
sports.

Geography of Heidelberg
Populated places on the Neckar basin
Populated riverside places in Germany